Au nord de notre vie (In the North of Our Lives) is an album by CANO, released in 1977. It was the band's second album and its last with founding member André Paiement.

The album's centrepiece track was a suite of three poems by writer Robert Dickson, including the poem that gave the album its title.

The 1980 National Film Board documentary, Cano - notes sur une expérience collective, documents the recording of this album and highlights each member in the studio.

Track listing
 "Che-Zeebe" (3:33) - (Rachel Paiement, Marcel Aymar)
 "Automne" (4:37) - (Aymar)
 "À la poursuite du nord (Suite)" (10:55)  (a) "Au nord de notre vie" - (Robert Dickson, Michel Kendel, A. Paiement, R. Paiement)  (b) "En mouvement" - (Robert Dickson, J. Doerr, R. Paiement)  (c) "Viens suivre" - (Dickson, David Burt)
 "La Première fois" (4:41) - (A. Paiement)
 "Mon pays" (12:10) - (A. Paiement, Burt, Kendel, John Doerr, Wasyl Kohut)
 "Frère Jacques" (3:22) - (trad. arr. Burt)
 "Spirit of the North" (5:59) - (Kohut)

Personnel
 Marcel Aymar - vocals, acoustic guitar, percussion
 David C. Burt - electric guitar, vocals
 Michel Dasti - percussion
 John Doerr - electric bass, synthesizer
 Michel Kendel - piano, synthesizer, vocals
 Wasyl Kohut - violins
 Rachel Paiement - vocals, acoustic guitar, percussion
 André Paiement  vocals, acoustic guitar, electric bass, percussion
 Kim Deschamps - dobro
 Monique Paiement - flute, vocals
 Matt Zimbel - percussion
 Alison Reynolds - cello
 Rick Francis - guitar
 Don Oriolo - producer
 Ed Stasium - recording engineer

References

1977 albums
CANO albums
A&M Records albums